Lilacia Park, an  garden, is located at 150 South Park Avenue, Lombard, Illinois, behind the Helen M. Plum Memorial Library. It specializes in lilacs and tulips. It is open to the public daily.

The garden was established by Colonel William Plum and his wife, Helen, who visited the lilac gardens of famous breeder Victor Lemoine (1823-1911), in Nancy, France. They returned with two cuttings (Mme. Casimir Perier, a double white, and Michel Buchner, a double light purple), which formed the basis of today's collection. After the Colonel's death in 1927 the grounds were left to the city as a public park.

The park now features more than 200 varieties of lilacs and 50 varieties of tulips, as well as a greenhouse, historical building, picnic areas, and drinking fountains.

Each year in May when Lilacs and other flowers are in full bloom, there is a "Lilac Time". This celebration includes visiting Lilacia Park to view all the blooming plants, the Lilac Parade down the Lombard Main Street, and the Lilac Princess Program contest.

The park was listed on the National Register of Historic Places in 2019.

Gallery

See also 
 List of botanical gardens in the United States

References

External links 

 
Photos (at Access312)

Arboreta in Illinois
Botanical gardens in Illinois
Lombard, Illinois
Protected areas of DuPage County, Illinois
1927 establishments in Illinois
National Register of Historic Places in DuPage County, Illinois